Virginia Ruano Pascual and Paola Suárez were the defending champions, but lost in the second round to Jelena Dokić and Corina Morariu.

Svetlana Kuznetsova and Martina Navratilova won in the final 3–6, 6–3, 6–1, against María Vento-Kabchi and Angelique Widjaja.

Seeds
The top four seeds receive a bye into the second round.

Draw

Finals

Top half

Bottom half

External links
Draw and Qualifying Draw

2003 Canada Masters and the Rogers AT&T Cup
Rogers ATandT Cup